Nares Land or Naresland is an island in far northern Greenland. The island is named after Polar explorer Sir George Nares.

Geography
The island lies between the Victoria Fjord and the Nordenskjöld Fjord separated from the Freuchen Land Peninsula of the mainland by a narrow sound. Stephenson Island and John Murray Island lie off its northern end.

The area where the island lies has a severe Polar climate and was formerly part of Avannaa, originally Nordgrønland ("North Greenland"), a former county of Greenland until 31 December 2008. The sea around the island is frozen practically the whole year round.

See also
List of islands of Greenland
Peary Land

References

Uninhabited islands of Greenland
Peary Land